Henry Arthur Britt (17 May 1883 – 23 April 1975) was an Australian rules footballer who played for the Melbourne Football Club and St Kilda Football Club in the Victorian Football League (VFL). He later played for Williamstown in the Victorian Football Association (VFA) from 1903-06 where he played 43 games and kicked 22 goals and was vice-captain in his final season. Britt received life membership of the Williamstown club in 1908.

Notes

External links 

 

1883 births
1975 deaths
Australian rules footballers from Victoria (Australia)
Melbourne Football Club players
St Kilda Football Club players
Williamstown Football Club players